Gianfranco Ganau (born 3 March 1955) is an Italian medic and politician, Mayor of Sassari from 2005 to 2014.

Biography
Graduated in Medicine at the University of Sassari, Ganau began his career as a cardiologist and became responsible of the emergency medical services in the province of Sassari and the province of Nuoro.

A member of the Democratic Party of the Left, in 1995 Ganau was elected city councilor of Sassari and lead till 2000 the Environmental Commission of the City Council. In 1998, Ganau joined the Democrats of the Left.

In 2005, Ganau became the centre-left candidate for the office of Mayor of Sassari and won at the first round with the 58% of the votes. Five years later, in 2010, Ganau was re-elected Mayor at the first round with the 66% of the votes; according to a 2010 poll published on Il Sole 24 Ore, Ganau ranked as the fifth most popular mayor in Italy, while in 2011 he ranked as the third most popular mayor in Italy.

In 2014, Ganau left his mayoral office, one year before the natural end of his term, in order to run at the Sardinian regional election for the Democratic Party. From 2014 to 2019, Ganau has been President of the Regional Council of Sardinia.

References

1955 births
Living people
People from Sassari
Mayors of Sassari
Democratic Party of the Left politicians
Democrats of the Left politicians
Democratic Party (Italy) politicians
20th-century Italian politicians
21st-century Italian politicians
University of Sassari alumni